August 2015

See also

References 

 08
August 2015 events in the United States